The Austin International Drag Festival is an annual drag festival in Austin, Texas, United States.

References

Annual events in Texas
Culture of Austin, Texas
Drag events